18 is the sixth studio album by American electronica musician, songwriter, and producer Moby. It was released on May 13, 2002 by Mute Records in the UK and on May 14, 2002 by V2 Records in the US. After the unexpected commercial and critical success of his previous album, Play (1999), Moby started to write songs for a follow-up during its supporting tour. He started work on the album at its conclusion in December 2000, using fewer samples than before. Guest vocalists include Azure Ray, MC Lyte, Angie Stone, and Sinéad O'Connor.

Following its release, 18 went to number one in 12 countries, including the UK, and reached number 4 in the US. The album went on to sell over 4 million copies worldwide. 18 B Sides + DVD, a collection of the album's B-sides and live video footage, was released a year later.

Background
In December 2000, Moby finished his world tour in support of his previous studio album, Play (1999), which had lasted for 21 consecutive months. He wanted to start on a follow-up as soon as it was over, by which time he had already recorded ideas for some new songs. This process was under way in the spring of 2001, with Moby using a Power Macintosh G3 and G4 to write and record with Pro Tools. He felt no pressure in delivering an album that matched the commercial success of Play, but an "artistic pressure" to make a record that he and others could enjoy.

Prior to starting on 18, Moby had friends in New York City, Los Angeles, and London search through local record shops for albums that contained strong vocals that he could use to sample from and write songs based on them, a technique he had used for Play. He received several hundred and from them, clipped vocal lines, often two or three words long, that caught his interest. From there, he played different chords on his piano that suited the part to build an outline for a song. He then stored the records in his cabinets. Moby composed the album in batches, transferring songs onto a CD and sending them to his management and the A&R representative at V2 with labels such as "Moby Ideas 2, August 2001" or "Moby Demos 3". After 10 months Moby had sent 35 discs comprising over 140 songs, which promoted ideas of making 18 a triple album, but his friends and management advised against it. There were arguments between Moby and V2 over the use of vocal samples on 18, and V2 believed that a follow-up album that sounded like Play was going to attract criticism.

Moby named the album after the number of tracks that he put on it, and his fondness towards the idea of the title being easily translated and known as something different in other countries. He pointed out that there are some "really esoteric reasons" for the title, but did not mention them. On his website, Moby hinted that those who had visited Israel and are familiar with conspiracy theories regarding extra-terrestrials may spot its significance. He said that Play and 18 were structured around the same motivation: "The desire to make compassionate records that meet a need in someone else's life."

By the time of the September 11 attacks in New York City, the album was almost recorded and finished. Following the incident, Moby made alterations to "Sleep Alone" as he found some of its lyrics "too prescient"; the line "Pieces of fire touch your hair" became "Pieces of light". Moby had written "Harbour" in 1984, at nineteen years of age; Sinead O'Connor was surprised upon learning this, as she initially thought the song related to pre- and post-September 11 events. O'Connor was too afraid to fly to New York City to record her vocals at the time, so she used a studio in London.

Prior to the album's release, V2 Records avoided to send advance copies to soundtrack supervisors. As Play had gained momentum after it was licensed to television and film productions, the label did not rule out the possibility of licensing tracks from 18 but wanted to hold out from doing so until the official launch.

Critical reception

18 received generally positive reviews from critics. At Metacritic, which assigns a normalized rating to reviews from mainstream critics, the album has a weighted average score of 61 out of 100 based on 21 reviews, indicating "generally favorable reviews".
Stephen Thomas Erlewine of AllMusic gave the album four stars out of five, writing that, "Moby not only creates a shimmering, reflective mood from the outset, but [that] he sustains it throughout the 18 songs, as the album shifts from pop and soul songs to soaring instrumental stretches letting the sound deepen and change colors with each new track."

Track listing

Sample credits
 "Another Woman" contains samples of "I'm a Good Woman", written and performed by Barbara Lynn.
 "Jam for the Ladies" contains samples of "Wherever You Are", written and performed by Mic Geronimo.
 "Sunday (The Day Before My Birthday)" contains samples of "Sunday", written and performed by Sylvia Robinson.

Personnel 
Credits are adapted from album liner notes.

Music

 Moby – instruments, vocals on "We Are All Made of Stars", "Signs of Love", "Extreme Ways" and "Sleep Alone"
 Azure Ray – vocals on "Great Escape"
 Freedom Bremner – vocals on "At Least We Tried"
 MC Lyte – vocals on "Jam for the Ladies"
 Dianne McCaulley – vocals on "One of These Mornings"
 Sinéad O'Connor – vocals on "Harbour"
 Shauna Phillips – vocals on "The Rafters"
 Lorraine Phillips – vocals on "The Rafters"
 Jennifer Price – vocals on "In This World"
 The Shining Light Gospel Choir – vocals on "In My Heart" and "I'm Not Worried at All"
 Angie Stone – vocals on "Jam for the Ladies"

Production
 Moby – production, engineering, mixing
 Tony Dawsey – mastering
 David Calderley – artwork, design
 Danny Clinch – photography

Charts

Weekly charts

Year-end charts

Decade-end charts

Certifications

References

External links
 
 

2002 albums
Moby albums
Albums produced by Moby
Mute Records albums
V2 Records albums